Vesna Elísa Smiljković (born 31 January 1983) is a Serbian-Icelandic football midfielder currently playing in Iceland's Úrvalsdeild kvenna for Fylkir.  She began her career in Serbian powerhouse Masinac Nis, with which she played the European Cup, before moving to Iceland where she has also played for Keflavik IF and Þór/KA. In 2014, she received an Icelandic citizenship.

She has been a member of the Serbian national team for a decade. One of her major highlights was scoring a goal in overtime versus England in September 2011 to attain a surprise draw against the Euro 2009 runner-up.

In February 2018, it was reported that she was pregnant and would miss most of the upcoming season.

In May 2020, she signed with Fylkir.

References

External links

1983 births
Living people
Serbian women's footballers
Serbia women's international footballers
Expatriate women's footballers in Iceland
Women's association football midfielders
Vesna Smiljković
Vesna Smiljković
Vesna Smiljković
ŽFK Mašinac PZP Niš players